

Ealhferth or Ealhfrith was a medieval Bishop of Winchester. He was consecrated between 862 and 867. He died between 871 and 877.

Citations

References

External links
 

Bishops of Winchester
9th-century English bishops
870s deaths
Year of birth unknown
Year of death uncertain